Corneliu Ion (born 27 June 1951) is a Romanian retired shooter who specialized in the 25 meter rapid fire pistol event. He competed at the 1976, 1980, 1984 and 1988 Olympics and won a gold medal in 1980 and a silver in 1984, placing fifth in 1976. In 1984 he served as the flag bearer for Romania at the opening ceremony. In 1975 he set a team world record at 2370 points and in 1977 equaled the individual world record at 598 points.

Ion graduated from the Bucharest Academy of Economic Studies and from the International School of Shooting Trainers in Wiesbaden in 1989. He took up shooting in 1969 at CSA Steaua București and later worked as a coach there for 12 years, becoming head of the shooting section in 1989. His trainees include Iulian Raicea and Sorin Babii. In parallel, between 1990 and 2001 he served as president of the Romanian Shooting Federation.  He was also a member of the Romanian Olympic Committee.

References

External links 
 
 
 

1951 births
Living people
Romanian male sport shooters
ISSF pistol shooters
Shooters at the 1976 Summer Olympics
Shooters at the 1980 Summer Olympics
Shooters at the 1984 Summer Olympics
Shooters at the 1988 Summer Olympics
Olympic shooters of Romania
Olympic gold medalists for Romania
Olympic silver medalists for Romania
Olympic medalists in shooting
Medalists at the 1984 Summer Olympics
Medalists at the 1980 Summer Olympics
Sportspeople from Focșani